Kyoto Prefectural Library (京都府立図書館 Kyōto Furitsu Toshokan) is a prefectural library located in Seishoji-cho 9, Okazaki, Sakyō-ku, Kyoto, Kyoto Prefecture. It was established in 1873, and is supported by the Kyoto prefectural government.

History 
 1873: Opened as Shushoin Library (Closed 1882)
 1898: Opened as the Kyoto Prefectural Library in Kyoto-gyoen
 1909: Opened as the Kyoto Prefectural Library in Okazaki, Kyoto
 1963: Many books transferred to the Kyoto Prefectural Library and Archives
 1995: The main building suffered serious damage in the Great Hanshin earthquake
 2001: Opened as a new building

Branch libraries 
 1949: Kawaramachi Branch Library opened (Closed May 1976)
 1950: Fushimi Branch Library opened. (Closed March 1988)
 1950: Miyazu Region Branch Library opened. (Closed March 1997)
 1950: Ayabe Region Branch Library opened. (Closed September 1966)
 1950: Mineyama Region Branch Library opened. (Closed March 1997)
 1951: Kamigyo Branch Library opened. (Closed May 1976)
 1952: Sonobe Region Branch Library opened. (Closed November 1966)
 1952: Kitakuwata Region Branch Library opened. (Closed March 1980)
 1952: Kizu Region Branch Library opened. (Closed March 1975)
 1957: Nakagyo Branch Library opened by taking over administration of Kawaramachi Branch Library. (Closed March 2001)

Further reading

External links 
 

Libraries in Japan